Lyndon Bateman (born 2 February 1979) is a former rugby union player for the Ospreys in the Celtic League. A lock forward, Bateman retired at the end of the 2009–10 season due to injury.

References

External links
Ospreys profile

1979 births
Living people
Ospreys (rugby union) players
Welsh rugby union players
Rugby union locks